Tommy Haas was the defending champion, but lost in the second round this year.

Andre Agassi won the tournament, beating Gilles Müller in the final, 6–4, 7–5.

Seeds

Draw

Finals

Top half

Bottom half

External links
 Main draw
 Qualifying draw

Los Angeles Open (tennis)
2005 ATP Tour